Jason Benetti (born September 9, 1983) is an American sportscaster. Since 2016, he has been the primary television play-by-play announcer of Chicago White Sox baseball and the alternate play-by-play announcer of Chicago Bulls basketball for NBC Sports Chicago. Now primarily contracted with Fox Sports and the Big Ten Network nationally, Benetti was formerly the main announcer for ESPN's alternate "StatCast" telecasts, and additionally has worked for NBC Sports, Westwood One, and Time Warner covering football, baseball, lacrosse, hockey, and basketball.

Early life and education
Benetti was born 10 weeks prematurely and hospitalized for three months. During the three months in the hospital, Benetti had a respiratory illness while in intensive care that deprived his blood of oxygen. It is believed that caused his cerebral palsy, which was diagnosed when Benetti was a toddler. He underwent years of physical therapy and two surgeries to improve his ability to walk.

Benetti grew up a few miles south of Chicago in Homewood, Illinois, and graduated from the Homewood-Flossmoor High School in 2001. He ran school's NCAA tournament pool and joined the school's radio station, WHFH (88.5) as a regular disc jockey and play-by-play announcer for Vikings sports coverage. Benetti's cerebral palsy prevented him from playing tuba during marching band season. Not wanting to exclude him, the band director asked him to serve as the halftime broadcaster for their marching events.

Benetti attended S. I. Newhouse School of Public Communications at Syracuse University and graduated in 2005 with bachelor’s degrees in broadcast journalism, economics and psychology. At Syracuse, he worked at WAER-FM where he called Syracuse Orange lacrosse and women's basketball.

After graduating, Benetti enrolled at Wake Forest University School of Law where he earned a Juris Doctor degree in 2011.

Career
During law school, Benetti acted as the voice of High Point Panthers basketball games, Syracuse Chiefs baseball games, and high school sports for Time Warner Cable Sports Channel. He also in worked roles with Fox Sports 1, Westwood One, Big East Conference, IMG College, Salem Avalanche, and DePaul University.

ESPN (2011–2022)
Benetti served as an intern for Chicago sports radio station WSCR. In 2011 Benetti joined ESPN, where his broadcasting career would move him into television, despite his childhood preference for radio-only broadcasting. Benetti would call select college basketball games for the ESPN3 online service, and then move on to ESPN2 and ESPNU. In 2013 Benetti called his first football game for ESPN's syndicated American Athletic Conference package.

In 2020, Benetti signed a multi-year extension with ESPN, and during that year called KBO League games remotely for the network due to the COVID-19-induced delay of the 2020 Major League Baseball season.

Chicago White Sox (2016–present)
Beginning with the 2016 season, Benetti replaced recently retired Hall of fame broadcaster Ken Harrelson as the television play-by-play announcer for select Chicago White Sox home and road games, where he would be paired with Steve Stone. In May 2017, the White Sox announced Benetti would take over full-time play-by-play duties in 2019 upon Harrelson's retirement.

NBC (2021–2022) 
In 2021, Benetti was named as play-by-play announcer for NBC's coverage of baseball at the 2020 Summer Olympics.

On April 26, 2022, it was reported that Benetti would serve as the lead play-by-play announcer for the new NBC Sports-produced MLB Sunday Leadoff games for Peacock, joined by rotating analysts representing the teams in each game.

Fox (2022–present) 
In August 2022, Benetti moved to Fox Sports and will do play by play for Fox's coverage of college football and basketball, as well as Major League Baseball.  Even after the move, he continued calling games for NBC Sports Chicago. 

In week 17 and 18 of the 2022 NFL season, Benetti would work his first games for the NFL on Fox, doing play-by-play as the Arizona Cardinals visited the Atlanta Falcons to start, followed by the Carolina Panthers against the New Orleans Saints in week 18 and filled-in for Brandon Gaudin, who filled-in for Wayne Larrivee on the Green Bay Packers radio network.

Personal life
Benetti works with the CHAT ("Communication Hope through Assistive Technology") Camp at Syracuse University's Burton Blatt Institute. At Syracuse’s Newhouse School, he taught sports broadcasting as an adjunct professor.

Benetti is part of the Cerebral Palsy Foundation's  'Just Say Hi'  campaign.

References

Living people
American people of Italian descent
American radio sports announcers
American television sports announcers
Chicago Bulls announcers
Chicago White Sox announcers
College baseball announcers in the United States
College basketball announcers in the United States
College football announcers
College hockey announcers in the United States
High school football announcers in the United States
Lacrosse announcers
Major League Baseball broadcasters
Minor League Baseball broadcasters
National Basketball Association broadcasters
National Football League announcers
People with cerebral palsy
S.I. Newhouse School of Public Communications alumni
Sportspeople from Chicago
Volleyball commentators
Wake Forest University School of Law alumni
Women's college basketball announcers in the United States
1983 births